Dragon C209 is the second Cargo Dragon 2 spacecraft, and the second in a line of International Space Station resupply craft which replaced the Dragon capsule, manufactured by SpaceX. The missions are contracted by NASA under the Commercial Resupply Services (CRS) program. It was being flown for the first time on the CRS-22 mission on 3 June 2021. This was the second flight for SpaceX under NASA's CRS Phase 2 contract awarded in January 2016. This was also the second time a Cargo Dragon was docked at the same time as a Crew Dragon spacecraft, SpaceX Crew-2. This mission used a new Booster B1067.1.

Cargo Dragon 
C209 is the second SpaceX Dragon 2 cargo variant. C209 and the other Cargo Dragons are different from the crewed variant by launching without seats, cockpit controls, astronaut life support systems, or SuperDraco abort engines. The Cargo Dragon improved on many aspects of the original Dragon design, including the recovery and refurbishment process.

The new Cargo Dragon capsules splash down under parachutes in the Atlantic Ocean east of Florida or in the Gulf of Mexico, rather than the previous recovery zone in the Pacific Ocean west of Baja California. This NASA preference was added to all CRS-2 awards to allow for cargo to be more quickly returned to the Kennedy Space Center after splashdown.

Flights

See also 
 SpaceX Crew-2
 Boeing CST-100 Starliner
 Cargo Dragon C208
 Cargo Dragon C211

References 

SpaceX Dragon 2
Individual space vehicles
NASA spacecraft
Uncrewed spacecraft
Cargo spacecraft